The Royal Canadian Mounted Police (RCMP) has a history dating back to 1873 and has been involved in several high-profile controversies.

Early controversies

Until 1920, the RCMP's forerunner, the Royal North-West Mounted Police, operated only in Western Canada and the North. The new organization was created by an amalgamation with the Dominion Police, giving the RCMP a national security mandate as a departure from its earlier role as a frontier police force. Early controversies grew from its preoccupation with Communism and the labour movement. Following from its operations in the Winnipeg General Strike of 1919, the RCMP intervened in labour disputes, not as an impartial law enforcement agency, but to assist with breaking strikes. In one incident, RCMP officers clashed with striking coal miners for 45 minutes in Estevan, Saskatchewan in 1933 and killed three miners during the Estevan Riot. Part of its strategy against labour organizing included extensive use of spies for surveillance of suspected Communists, which was revealed at the court trial that convicted the leadership of the Communist Party under Section 98 of the Criminal Code in 1932. Political surveillance activities were conducted out of its Criminal Investigation Department until a separate branch, the RCMP Security Service, was established in 1950. The RCMP was also the force used to stop the On-to-Ottawa Trek by precipitating another bloody clash that left one Regina city police officer and one protester dead in the 1935 Regina Riot. The Mounties were frequently criticized for these activities by labour and the left, including one of its most prominent surveillance targets, Member of Parliament J. S. Woodsworth. A dispute with the Government of Alberta over prohibition led to the creation of a separate Alberta Provincial Police from 1917 to 1932.

Killing of Inuit-owned sled dogs

There have been many Inuit accounts related to the alleged killings of sled dogs during the 1950s, 1960s and 1970s, as well as the impact of the federal government's efforts during that time to relocate Inuit into modern settlements.

Theft of dynamite
In April 1971, a team of RCMP officers broke into the storage facilities of Richelieu Explosives, and stole an unspecified amount of dynamite. A year later, in April 1972, officers hid four cases of dynamite in Mont Saint-Grégoire, in an attempt to link the explosives with the FLQ. This was later admitted by Solicitor General Francis Fox on October 31, 1977.

Intelligence mole
In 1967, it was suspected that there was a Soviet infiltrator in the ranks of Canadian intelligence.  Suspicion initially fell upon Leslie James Bennett.  With Bennett's personal leftist politics, and past acquaintanceship with defector Kim Philby, he has pilloried as the most likely suspect by the RCMP themselves, although the RCMP was asked to investigate Bennett by James Jesus Angleton of the CIA. The accusations and interrogations by the police led to the breakdown of Bennett's marriage and early retirement.

In the 1980s it was discovered that the mole had actually been Sergeant Gilles Brunet, the son of an RCMP assistant commissioner.

Barn-burning scandal
On the night of May 6, 1972, the RCMP Security Service burned down a barn owned by Paul Rose's and Jacques Rose's mother in Sainte-Anne-de-la-Rochelle, Quebec. They suspected that separatists were planning to meet with members of the Black Panthers from the United States. The arson came after they failed to convince a judge to allow them to wiretap the alleged meeting place. This was later admitted by Solicitor General Francis Fox on October 31, 1977.

RCMP Assistant Commissioner Rod Stamler later said that the barn-burning operation was "morally wrong and unlawful" and if the police leadership condones such actions, it will lose control of the (police) force."

Staff Sergeant Donald McCleery (1934-2014) was involved in the operation, and following his retirement from the RCMP ran his own "investigation and surveillance" company in Montreal, Quebec. The firm was acquired by Gardium Sécurité in 2008.

Theft of PQ members list
In 1973, more than thirty members of the RCMP Security Service committed a break-in to steal a computerized members list of Parti Québécois members, in an investigation dubbed Operation Ham.  This was later admitted by Solicitor General Francis Fox on October 28, 1977.  John Starnes (RCMP), head of the RCMP Security Service, claimed that the purpose of this operation was to investigate allegations that the PQ had funneled $200,000 worth of donations through a Swiss banking account.

Break-ins and bombing 
A series of more than 400 illegal break-ins by the RCMP were revealed by Vancouver Sun reporter John Sawatsky in his front-page exposé headline "Trail of break-in leads to RCMP cover-up" on December 7, 1976. The story won the Vancouver Sun the Michener Award that year.

It wasn't until the following year that it was uncovered that the October 6, 1972, break-in at the Agence de Presse Libre du Québec office, had been the work of an RCMP investigation dubbed Operation Bricole, not right-wing militants as previously believed. The small leftist Quebec group had reported more than a thousand significant files missing or damaged following the break-in. One RCMP, one SQ and one SPVM officer pleaded guilty on June 16, 1977, but were given unconditional discharges.

A similar break-in occurred at the same time, at the office of the Mouvement pour la Défense des Prisonniers Politiques Québécois.

In 1974, RCMP Security Service Corporal Robert Samson was arrested at a hospital after a failed bombing - the bomb exploded while in his hands, causing him to lose some fingers and tearing his eardrums -  at the house of Sam Steinberg, founder of Steinberg Foods in Montreal. While this bombing was not sanctioned by the RCMP, at trial he announced that he had done "much worse" on behalf of the RCMP, and admitted he had been involved in the APLQ break-in.

On April 19, 1978, the Director of the RCMP criminal operations branch, admitted that the RCMP had entered more than 400 premises without warrant since 1970.

Inquiries
In 1977, the Quebec provincial government launched the Keable Inquiry into Illegal Police Activities, which resulted in 17 members of the RCMP being charged with 44 offences.

In the same year, a Royal Commission was formed by Justice David McDonald  entitled Inquiry Into Certain Activities of the Royal Canadian Mounted Police to investigate allegations of vast wrongdoing by the national police force. The inquiry's 1981 recommendation was to limit the RCMP's role in intelligence operations, and resulted in the formation of the Canadian Security Intelligence Service three years later.

The Savoie scandal
In 1992 a senior RCMP officer Claude Savoie was exposed as corrupt, causing a major scandal that ended with Savoie shooting himself in his Ottawa office. One of Savoie's subordinates, Jorge Leite, was found guilty of corruption in 1999.

Excessive use of force at the 1997 APEC Summit
In 1997, the APEC summit was held in Vancouver, British Columbia. Controversy arose after officers of the Royal Canadian Mounted Police used pepper spray and strip searches against protesters, who were objecting to the presence of several autocratic leaders such as Indonesian president Suharto.  A subsequent public inquiry concluded that the RCMP was at fault, showing a lack of professionalism and a failure of planning.  The report also charged that the Canadian government interfered with police operations, possibly  in an effort to shield certain leaders from being publicly embarrassed by the protests.

Killing of Darren Varley
In 1999 RCMP Constable Michael Ferguson fatally shot local resident Darren Varley after being attacked inside the holding cells at a Pincher Creek police station. Ferguson was prosecuted twice for murder, resulting in two hung juries, and was then convicted of the killing and found guilty of manslaughter.

RCMP bombing in Alberta, scapegoating farmer 

The RCMP bombed an oilsite in Alberta on October 14, 1998, on the instructions of the Alberta Energy Co. No injuries were caused or intended. The Crown lawyers, representing the government, accepted that the allegations were true. An Alberta farmer was blamed for the bombing. He had been complaining about oil pollution causing a nuisance. The court held him and another farmer without bail.

Torture scandal: Ahmad El Maati, Abdullah Almalki and Maher Arar
On September 26, 2002, during a stopover in New York City en route from a family vacation in Tunisia to Montreal, Maher Arar was detained by the United States Immigration and Naturalization Service, acting upon information supplied by the RCMP.
Arar was sent to Syria where he was imprisoned for more than 10 months, tortured and forced to sign a false confession that he had trained in Al Qaeda camps in Afghanistan. A public campaign ended in his release and won a public inquiry into his case, which found that he had no ties to terrorism.

Like Arar, Ahmad El Maati, Abdullah Almalki and Muayyed Nureddin are Canadian Muslim men who were detained and tortured overseas while under investigation by Canadian investigators. They were all detained when they arrived in Syria and taken to the same Syrian detention centre — the Far' Falastin, or Palestine Branch — of the Syrian Military Intelligence. All were tortured. All were interrogated by the same Syrian interrogation team, who accused them all of links to terrorism using information and questions that could only have originated with Canadian agencies. The Arar Inquiry has already determined that the RCMP sent questions for Abdullah Almalki to his Syrian interrogators. As in the case of Arar, unnamed Canadian officials used the media to publicly accuse El Maati and Almalki of having ties to al-Qaeda. No Canadian official has admitted to making these accusations in the media, and many years later, no evidence has ever been produced to back their claims. Like Arar, El Maati and Nureddin were eventually released without charge. Almalki was cleared, acquitted and released. When they returned to Canada, they all called for a process which would expose the truth about the role of Canadian agencies in what happened to them, and which would help them clear their names and rebuild their lives.

On September 28, 2006, RCMP Commissioner Giuliano Zaccardelli issued a carefully worded public apology to Arar and his family during the House of Commons committee on public safety and national security:
Mr. Arar, I wish to take this opportunity to express publicly to you and to your wife and to your children how truly sorry I am for whatever part the actions of the RCMP may have contributed to the terrible injustices that you experienced and the pain that you and your family endured.

In a subsequent December 2006 appearance in front of the Commons committee, Zaccardelli said the timeline—regarding what he knew at the time and what he told government ministers—given in his first appearance in September was inaccurate. He resigned the following day.

On January 26, 2007, after months of negotiations between the Canadian government and Arar's Canadian legal counsel, Prime Minister Stephen Harper issued a formal apology "for any role Canadian officials may have played in what happened to Mr. Arar, Monia Mazigh and their family in 2002 and 2003" and announced that Arar would receive $10.5 million settlement for his ordeal and an additional $1 million for legal costs. Ahmad El Maati and Abdullah Almalki, meanwhile, still await answers in their cases from the secretive Iacobucci Inquiry into the RCMP and other Canadian agencies' alleged role in their overseas detention and torture.

Pension fund scandal
In 2004, Andrew McIntosh, an investigative journalist at The National Post, revealed a secret audit that detailed misuse of millions of dollars by the RCMP of its own members' pension fund.

He also revealed that several people had been forced from their jobs because of the scandal, but that there had not been a proper probe into the irregularities. The same day his story was published, Commissioner Zaccardelli announced the force would pay back to the pension fund the millions misused and that he called for a police probe by Ottawa Police Force, though Zaccardelli somehow managed to maintain control over the probe and nobody was subsequently charged.

After Zaccardelli's resignation in 2007, a public accounts committee heard several testimonies from former and serving RCMP officers alleging serious fraud and nepotism at the upper management level under Zaccardelli. The fraud allegations go back to 2002 and are related to RCMP pension and insurance plans for members of the force. Zaccardelli launched and then two days later cancelled a criminal investigation into the matter, which was resumed by the Ottawa Police Service after his resignation. That investigation found serious nepotism and wasteful spending. A follow-up investigation by the Auditor-General found millions of dollars inappropriately charged to the pension and insurance plans.

A subsequent investigation conducted by a former head of the Ontario Securities Commission strongly criticized the management style of Zaccardelli, who, he said, was responsible for "a fundamental breach of trust" and called for a major shake-up of the force. Specifically, RCMP members and employees who attempted to address the pension fund issue suffered "career damage" for doing so, according to the investigators findings. Interim RCMP Commissioner Beverley Busson concurred with the recommendations and promised that individuals that the upper ranks attempted to silence would be thanked and recognized.

Constable Justin Harris and the Prince George RCMP
Following the 2002 case of a Prince George judge, David Ramsay, who pleaded guilty to misconduct with young prostitutes, similar allegations were made against Constable Justin Harris and other RCMP officers. Harris was accused of having touched an underage prostitute, paying a prostitute for sex, and refusing to pay at all, between 1993 and 2001.

The Royal Canadian Mounted Police Act forbids a hearing from taking place more than one-year after a senior officer has been made aware of such allegations, but because the allegations had been made against nine officers with little evidence, the RCMP did not launch a criminal investigation against Harris and did not launch a misconduct hearing until 2005. On October 4, 2006, the RCMP disciplinary board decided to stop all proceedings against Harris because the investigation conflicted with the RCMP Act. (This decision has since been appealed by the senior RCMP officer in BC) Public outcry from people like Daisy Kler of Vancouver Rape Relief and Women's Shelter criticized the RCMP's internal investigation policies.

Ian Bush incident
On October 29, 2005, Ian Bush, 22 was arrested in Houston, British Columbia. At the RCMP detachment office, Bush died due to a single gunshot wound to the back of the head.

Constable Paul Koester and Bush were alone in the interrogation room. Koester claimed Bush attacked him, and that he was being choked from behind to unconsciousness and acted in self-defence. An investigation was conducted by an RCMP team brought in from another region. That investigation was reviewed by several agencies including the Ministry of the Attorney General of BC, and the federal Civilian Review and Complaints Commission for the Royal Canadian Mounted Police. Koester was cleared of any wrongdoing. The Coroner's Inquest into the death reached the same conclusion.

Conflicting evidence was given at the inquest. The analyses of the blood spatter evidence by an RCMP forensics officer, Jim Hignell, and Edmonton police constable, Joseph Slemko, differed; the former supporting Koester's account, the latter contradicting it.

Robert Dziekański Taser incident
The Robert Dziekański Taser incident occurred when Dziekański, a Polish immigrant, arrived at the Vancouver International Airport on October 13, 2007. After being released from Customs after a ten-hour delay, he became agitated and violent. Four RCMP officers attended to arrest Dziekański; one fired a Taser after which Dziekański fell to the ground. He was then pinned and handcuffed by the officers, and then Tasered repeatedly until he lost consciousness. Testimony from the officers differs regarding whether or not Dziekański's pulse was checked, but when paramedics arrived approximately 15 minutes later he could not be resusciated, and he was declared dead at the scene. Police were heavily criticized for their handling of the incident, and the incident has revived debate concerning police use of tasers in Canada. A public inquiry into the incident ruled Dziekański's death a homicide, and two of the officers were convicted of perjury for giving false statements to the inquiry regarding their actions in the incident.

Royal Inland Hospital taser incident
In May 2008, at Royal Inland Hospital in Kamloops, an RCMP officer used a taser on 82-year-old Frank Lasser while he was in his hospital bed. He was reportedly "delirious" and wielding a knife.

Allegation of political bias against Insite
In October 2008, it was revealed that the RCMP had used taxpayer money to pay individuals to write negative, politically biased reports about the Vancouver safe injection site, Insite. In addition to this, memos were distributed referring to British Columbia's Centre for Excellence in HIV/AIDS - a nationally renowned repository of some of the top AIDS research in the world - as the "Centre for Excrements", and suggesting stacking radio shows with callers against Insite.

Mountie takes woman home from jail 

In 2011, a northern Manitoba RCMP officer took an intoxicated woman he had arrested out of a cell and to his home to "pursue a personal relationship." Several of his colleagues witnessed this but only two reported it. The constable admitted to the allegations, got a reprimand and lost pay for seven days. The Nisichawayasihk Cree Nation has called for an independent investigation.

Criticism from SCC on failure to protect wife who hired hitman
In January 2013, the Supreme Court of Canada criticized the RCMP for pursuing charges against Nicole Doucet Ryan (also known as Nicole Patricia Ryan) after she attempted to hire an undercover officer as a hitman to kill her husband. The criticisms were based on her post-arrest courtroom allegations of abuse, which proved highly controversial since the judges based their decision and criticism entirely on her testimony that she had called the RCMP to report the abuse but received no help. The former husband was never called to appear in court but refuted that he was abusive. After an internal investigation the RCMP stated that no allegations of abuse were ever brought forward by Nicole Ryan. On February 6, it was announced that The Civilian Review and Complaints Commission for the Royal Canadian Mounted Police would investigate the allegations.

High River weapons search 

On June 21, 2013, High River, Alberta suffered major flooding; the residents were evacuated, and the town searched for anyone stranded. By June 24, High River RCMP reported to Edmonton that they had completed their search of every home in town, 3,337 in all. After June 24 the RCMP checked approximately 1900 homes for firearms. The check continued until July 10.

Discrimination against women

Janet Merlo claim of misconduct
In 2007 Janet Merlo filed a claim of harassment and misconduct against the RCMP stating that their continual abuse over a decade of service had led to depression and post-traumatic stress disorder. In 2015, hearings were held to determine if her case should be elevated to a class action, as nearly 400 other women officers had asked to join it.

Sherry Lee Benson-Podolchuk
In 2007, Sherry Lee Benson-Podolchuk wrote and published Women Not Wanted, which detailed her experiences with frequent harassment during her 20-year career as the sole female officer in the Prairie region at the time. Benson-Podolchuk sued the RCMP, eventually settling out of court in 2009.

Catherine Galliford claim of sexual harassment
In November 2011, Corporal Catherine Galliford, a former spokeswoman for the British Columbia Division, came forward with a claim that she had been the victim of sexual harassment by senior officers as far back as 1991, when she graduated from the RCMP Academy.

Sexual harassment settlements

In October 2016, RCMP commissioner Bob Paulson apologized for what he referred to as "shameful conduct" by the organization. An internal investigation determined that up to 20,000 female officers and civilian employees since 1974, may have been the victim of harassment, discrimination, and/or sexual abuse. Additionally, the organization has set aside a $100 million compensation fund for victims. They did not however address the matter of SSgt Caroline O’Farrell, who brought a separate suit due to her treatment while part of the iconic Musical Ride in the late 1980s.

On July 8, 2019 the National Post announced that a $100 million settlement was reached in a class-action lawsuit against the RCMP for sexual harassment. The Federal Government of Canada and the RCMP have entered into a Settlement Agreement in the Tiller et al., vs Her Majesty the Queen (Federal Court File Number T-1673-17) to compensate qualified claimants who have been subjected to the gender or sexual orientation based discrimination and/or harassment. The previous similar 2017 Merlo and Davidson Class Action Settlement only compensated female members and a limited number of public servants. Compensation for proven claims over the 45-year period would range from $10,000 to $222,000 each.

The 2016 settlement for $100 million covered female officers who had been sexually harassed in the RCMP since September 1974. A second settlement in 2019 for $100 million was for women in non-policing roles at the RCMP. According to the CBC in 2019, around 2,500 women were expected to claim claims under both of the settlements. The payouts are only allowed for living officers, with payments denied to the families of Mounties who had committed suicide since coming forward about the harassment.

Animal abuse
In 2017, allegations of animal abuse against horses used for the RCMP Musical Ride emerged. Following the allegations, the riding master conducting the musical rides, Mike Côté was removed from his post and restricted to administrative duties. This revived previous allegations going back as far as 2004 that the officer severely beat a horse until it was bleeding, punching another horse and ramming another into a wall. Other previous claims of public concerns were cited that he was promoted to a horse master.

Four years earlier, Staff Sgt. Caroline O’Farrell filed a lawsuit against thirteen colleagues in the musical ride alleging physical and sexual abuse.

Kinder Morgan pipeline in Canada
During early stages of the construction of the controversial Kinder Morgan pipeline which was met by massive protests and physical resistance, the RCMP was brought in to disperse them. This resulted in a number of arrests. Amongst those arrested were Member of Parliament Elizabeth May and Tamo Campos, grandson of David Suzuki, which the activist made a speech against, and criticized the RCMP's actions.

Opponents of the Kinder Morgan pipeline alleged that the RCMP deliberately targeted them for arrests.

Homophobia
On November 11, 2020 the Honourable Michel Bastarache, C.C. Q.C. Independent Assessor, released his report Broken Dreams Broken Lives. In it Bastarache wrote "What I learned led me to conclude that a toxic culture prevails in the RCMP. This culture encourages, or at least tolerates, misogynistic, racist and homophobic attitudes among many members of the RCMP."

See also
 List of cases of police brutality in Canada
 Royal Commission of Inquiry into Certain Activities of the RCMP
 Corruption in Canada
 Human rights in Canada

References

Further reading
 RCMP scandals and setbacks since 2006, The Globe and Mail, March 29, 2007
 Tips For Canadian Citizens On How To Survive An Encounter With The RCMP, Cannabis Culture Magazine, September 2, 2007
 Kerry Pither's Dark Days: The Story of Four Canadians Tortured in the Name of Fighting Terror documents how three men targeted by an RCMP national security investigation were detained, interrogated and tortured overseas. It tells the stories of Ahmad El Maati, Abdullah Almalki, Maher Arar and Muayyed Nureddin.
The fifth estate

External links
RCMP Watch

Canadian commissions and inquiries
Legal history of Canada
Royal Canadian Mounted Police
Human rights abuses in Canada
Royal Canadian Mounted Police
Police misconduct in Canada
Royal Canadian Mounted Police
Lists of events in Canada